Bernardo Castello (or Castelli) (1557–1629) was an Italian painter of the late-Mannerist style, active mainly in Genoa and Liguria.  He is mainly known as a portrait and historical painter.

Biography
He was apprenticed under Andrea Semino and Luca Cambiaso, then travelled throughout Italy, meeting other painters and creating his own particular style.

During his career he painted many works and was appreciated by famous poets with whom he had friendships.
Amongst these were Gabriello Chiabrera and Torquato Tasso, and Castello was the illustrator for Jerusalem Delivered by Tasso, published in 1590 (and also for a further edition, published in 1617). Some of these illustrations were engraved by Agostino Carracci.

Beside working in Genoa, Castello was employed in Rome and worked also for the Duke of Savoy, Charles Emmanuel I.

Bernardo Castello died in October 1629 aged seventy-two years following a short illness, as he was about to go to Rome, where he had been requested to paint a picture for St. Peter's Basilica. He was buried in the church of San Martino of Albaro.

Valerio Castello, was his youngest son. Valerio was only six when Bernardo died, but went on to become one of the greatest Genoese painters of the 17th century.

Works 
During his long career Bernardo Castello produced many works. The following list is not exhaustive:

 Frescoes with scenes of Jerusalem Delivered in De Franchi palace, Genoa
 Frescoes in Palazzo Spinola di Pellicceria, Genoa 
 Frescoes in Imperiale palace, Genoa
 Fresco depicting “Martyrdom of St. John the Baptist” in the church of Jesus (Genoa)
 St Francis of Paola, painting in the church of Our Lady of Mount Carmel and St. Agnes (Genoa)
 Esther and Ahasuerus, painting in the church of the Saints Cosmas and Damian, Genoa
 Madonna and Child with Saints Nicholas and Magdalene, altarpiece in the church of St Mary Magdalene, Genoa
 Enthroned Madonna with St John and other Saints, painting in the church known as the “Commenda” (St. John of Pré, in Genoa)
 Saints Roch, Nazarius and Celsus, Catherine of Siena and Sebastian, altarpiece in the Oratory of St Celsus (Genoa-Sturla)
 Two paintings which depict “Deposition” and “Madonna with Child and saints”, in the church of San Bartolomeo della Certosa (Genoa-Rivarolo).
 Martyrdom of St Peter of Verona (1597) painting and frescoes on the ceiling of the church of Santa Maria di Castello in Genoa.
 St Bernard in the chair between St Erasmus and St Nicholas painting in the oratory of St Bernard in Santa Margherita Ligure (discovered in 2007)
 Virgin of the Rosary, altarpiece in the shrine of Our Lady of the Rose in Santa Margherita Ligure
 Crucifix with the saints Prosper and Catherine of Alexandria, altarpiece in the church of Santa Maria Assunta (Camogli)
 Histories of the Virgin, frescoes on ceiling and cupola of the Sanctuary of Nostra Signora della Misericordia, near Savona
 Madonna and Child with Angels and “Adoration of the Shepherds, paintings in the same shrine
 Assumption of the Virgin, painting in the church of St. Catherine (Rossiglione)
 St John the Baptist, St Anthony the abbot and Mary Magdalenepainting in the church of St. George, Busalla
 Annunciation, altarpiece in the church of St George (Sarissola, quarter of Busalla).
 Martyrdom of St Lawrence, altarpiece in the church of San Lorenzo of Torbi, Ceranesi
 Stoning of Saint Stephen the Protomartyr'', painting in the church of San Giorgio dei Genovesi, Palermo

Notes

External links

 Paintings by Castello at ImageBase
 Paintings by Castello at A&A

References

1557 births
1629 deaths
16th-century Italian painters
Italian male painters
17th-century Italian painters
Mannerist painters
Painters from Genoa